Hyperchirioides is a genus of moths in the family Saturniidae. The genus was erected by Claude Lemaire in 1981.

Species
Hyperchirioides bulaea (Maassen & Weyding, 1885)

References

Hemileucinae